The 2016 German Darts Masters was the second of ten PDC European Tour events on the 2016 PDC Pro Tour. The tournament took place at the Ballhausforum, Munich, Germany, between 26–28 March 2016. It featured a field of 48 players and £115,000 in prize money, with £25,000 going to the winner.

Michael van Gerwen was the defending champion, having beaten John Henderson 6–5 in the previous edition. He retained his title by defeating Peter Wright 6–4 in the final.

Prize money
The prize money of the European Tour events stays the same as last year.

Qualification and format
The top 16 players from the PDC ProTour Order of Merit on 15 January automatically qualified for the event and were seeded in the second round. 

The remaining 32 places went to players from three qualifying events - 20 from the UK Qualifier (held in Wigan on 17 January), eight from the European Qualifier on 23 January and four from the Host Nation Qualifier on 25 March.

The following players will take part in the tournament:

Top 16
  Michael van Gerwen (winner)
  Michael Smith (semi-finals)
  Peter Wright (runner-up)
  James Wade (second round)
  Kim Huybrechts (second round)
  Adrian Lewis (third round)
  Ian White (quarter-finals)
  Dave Chisnall (third round)
  Robert Thornton (second round)
  Jelle Klaasen (third round)
  Terry Jenkins (second round)
  Gary Anderson (quarter-finals)
  Benito van de Pas (third round)
  Brendan Dolan (second round)
  Mensur Suljović (second round)
  Justin Pipe (second round)

UK Qualifier
  Mark Barilli (first round)
  Mark Walsh (second round)
  Stephen Bunting (second round)
  Alan Norris (first round)
  Chris Dobey (quarter-finals)
  Ben Davies (first round)
  James Richardson (quarter-finals)
  John Bowles (second round)
  Daryl Gurney (second round)
  Nathan Aspinall (first round)
  Steve Beaton (first round)
  Darren Johnson (first round)
  Stuart Kellett (first round)
  Andrew Gilding (first round)
  Peter Hudson (first round)
  Joe Cullen (semi-finals)
  William O'Connor (third round)
  Kevin Painter (third round)
  Devon Petersen (second round)
  James Wilson (third round)

European Qualifier
  Cristo Reyes (third round)
  Thomas Junghans (first round)
  Dimitri Van den Bergh (first round)
  Mike Zuydwijk (first round)
  John Michael (first round)
  Jeffrey de Graaf (second round)
  Ronny Huybrechts (second round)
  Jermaine Wattimena (second round)

Host Nation Qualifier
  Tomas Seyler (first round)
  René Eidams (second round)
  Fabian Herz (first round)
  Marko Puls (first round)

Draw

References

2016 PDC European Tour
2016 in German sport